The Planter Road – Jackson Creek Bridge is a bridge located on Planter Road over Jackson Creek in Wakefield Township, Michigan. It was listed on the National Register of Historic Places in 1999.

Description

The superstructure contains two 50-foot through girders, made from a steel plate with riveted angle flanges and web stiffeners. The deck of the bridge supported by I-beam stringers, over which concrete is laid. The bridge is a strictly utilitarian structure, with no architectural detailing of any kind. No alterations have been made to the bridge, and it is in the original, well-preserved condition.

History
The bridge was constructed in 1923 to provide access to the new community of Planter. The bridge uses a design from the Michigan State Highway Department that was first implemented in 1907-1908, but had been almost completely dropped by 1923. The bridge is one of the last remaining of this type in Michigan, and still carries vehicular traffic.

See also
 
 
 
 National Register of Historic Places listings in Gogebic County, Michigan

References

External links

Photos of Planter Road – Jackson Creek Bridge

Road bridges on the National Register of Historic Places in Michigan
Bridges completed in 1923
Buildings and structures in Gogebic County, Michigan
National Register of Historic Places in Gogebic County, Michigan
Steel bridges in the United States
Plate girder bridges in the United States
1923 establishments in Michigan